The Oldham West and Royton by-election was a UK parliamentary by-election held on 3 December 2015 in the constituency of Oldham West and Royton in Greater Manchester. This was the first by-election of the 56th UK Parliament.

The by-election was caused by the death of the sitting Member of Parliament (MP) Michael Meacher on 21 October 2015; Meacher had been the Labour Party MP for the seat since its creation in 1997 and had represented its predecessor seat of Oldham West since 1970.

A writ for the by-election was moved in Parliament on 2 November 2015, setting polling day as 3 December 2015.

Jim McMahon held the seat for Labour with a winning 62% of the vote, an increase of 7.3 percentage points. There was a 40.3% turnout.

Candidates

Six candidates contested the election; the statement of persons nominated was released by Oldham Council on 9 November 2015.

The Labour Party, which last held the seat, selected its candidate on 5 November 2015 from a shortlist of four: Mohammed Azam, National Executive Committee member and former local councillor; Jane East, who contested the seat of Colne Valley unsuccessfully at the 2015 general election; Failsworth East councillor Jim McMahon, leader of Oldham Council; and Chris Williamson, former MP for Derby North. McMahon won the selection, reportedly with 232 votes against 141 for Azam in the final round, after the elimination of East and Williamson.

UK Independence Party (UKIP) came second in the constituency at the 2015 general election and fielded a new candidate, John Bickley, who was runner-up at the by-election held in 2014 in the neighbouring constituency of Heywood and Middleton. Others talked about as potential candidates were Paul Nuttall, the UKIP deputy leader, and Steven Woolfe, both MEPs for North West England.

The Conservative Party came a close third to UKIP at the 2015 general election and selected James Daly, a solicitor and Bury councillor, who contested the Bolton North East constituency in 2015. He is current Member of Parliament for Bury North after being elected in the 2019 United Kingdom general election.

The Liberal Democrat candidate was Jane Brophy, who works for the NHS in Greater Manchester and has served as a Trafford councillor for over 15 years; she was LibDem candidate for Altrincham and Sale West at the 2010 and 2015 general elections.

Simeon Hart stood for the Green Party, having contested the constituency for the Greens at the 2015 general election.

Sir Oink A-Lot stood for the Official Monster Raving Loony Party.

Results

Aftermath
The result was considered by commentators as surprisingly good for Labour, who had been expected to be more closely challenged by UKIP. It was also reported as a boost for Jeremy Corbyn's leadership of the party.

On the morning after the by-election, UKIP leader Nigel Farage and some other party sources claimed that there had been voting fraud particularly around ethnic minority voters and around postal votes, with Farage claiming the vote was "bent" and that in constituencies with large numbers of ethnic minority voters who do not speak English, "effectively the electoral process is now dead". Paul Nuttall, UKIP's deputy leader, said to journalists: "You've got to ask yourself, is this Britain or is this Harare?" However, others in UKIP downplayed the allegations, with deputy chairman Suzanne Evans saying the party risks sounding like "bad losers". Tom Watson, Labour's deputy leader, dismissed the complaints as "sour grapes".

Farage stated that he was planning to make a formal complaint about the allegations. Nuttall wrote an open letter to Greg Clark, the Secretary of State for the Department for Communities and Local Government, raising concerns about postal voting processes.

Previous result

See also

 Oldham
 Royton
 1968 Oldham West by-election
 List of United Kingdom by-elections (2010–present)
 Parliament of the United Kingdom

References

2015 in England
2015 elections in the United Kingdom
By-elections to the Parliament of the United Kingdom in Greater Manchester constituencies
Politics of North West England
Elections in Greater Manchester
2010s in Greater Manchester